The Z24 class (formerly B55 class) was a two-cylinder, non-condensing, saturated 2-6-0 ‘ Mogul‘ type steam engine built by Dübs and Company for the New South Wales Government Railways of Australia.

Order
Following the success of the B205 class, in 1889 the New South Wales Government Railways ordered an additional 25 locomotives of a basically similar design from Dübs and Company. These locomotives had a deeper firebox, steel cab and weighed an extra nine tonnes. They were pooled with the B205 class in general working. The first locomotive entered traffic on 10 March 1891 and all were in service by August that year.

Operation
They took a generally unobtrusive part in main line goods traffic until displaced by the T524/TF939/K1353 class locomotives. They then moved on to branch lines until displaced by the C30T class locomotives which arrived in the mid-1920s.

Demise and preservation
As boiler renewals became due between 1929 and 1960, their numbers were depleted through either scrapping or disposal. Representatives found their way on to the private lines of such organisations as Bunnerong Power Station, Nepean Sand & Gravel at North Richmond and Hunter Region collieries.

The last locomotive withdrawn was 2413 in November 1960, following an enthusiast tour to Richmond. It joined 2408 and 2414 at Bunnerong Power Station until 1975.

References

2-6-0 locomotives
Dübs locomotives
Railway locomotives introduced in 1889
Standard gauge locomotives of Australia
24